Dilano van 't Hoff (born 26 July 2004) is a Dutch racing driver who is currently competing in the Formula Regional European Championship for MP Motorsport. He is the 2021 F4 Spanish Championship champion.

Career

Karting 
Van 't Hoff started his international karting career at the age of eleven, competing in the SKUSA SuperNationals. The Dutchman finished third in both the IAME Euro Series and IAME International Final in 2018, the same year in which he finished sixth in his first season of the European Championship. He ended the following year fifth in the same series, this time in the OK class, and won the Trofeo delle Industrie with Forza Racing.

Lower formulae 
In 2021 Van 't Hoff made his single-seater debut with Xcel Motorsport in the Formula 4 UAE Championship. His season started successfully, as, despite stalling at the start of the first race, the Dutchman was able to come back to second in that race and would go on to win the following two races, having started both from pole position. Van 't Hoff was then able to extend his gap to his nearest rival Enzo Trulli by winning two more races at the next round at Yas Marina. After another win at round three in Dubai Van 't Hoff would lose his gap to Trulli thanks to a disqualification in the final race of the penultimate event, stripping him off another podium and more crucial points for the championship. He would go on to eventually lose out to Trulli by just one point in the final round.

For his main campaign, Van 't Hoff joined MP Motorsport in the F4 Spanish Championship. His first two wins came at the first round of the series at the Circuit de Spa-Francorchamps, and Van 't Hoff then went on a run of six podiums in a row, including three wins and a triple podium at Algarve. He scored his next victory in the sprint race at the Circuit Ricardo Tormo after original winner Daniel Macia had been given a penalty for extending track limits, and followed this up with another podium in the third race. At the penultimate round of the season, van 't Hoff completed a hattrick of poles and race wins, thus winning the championship.

Formula Regional European Championship

2021 
In September 2021 Van 't Hoff made his debut in the Formula Regional European Championship, racing for MP Motorsport on the Circuit Ricardo Tormo as a guest driver.

2022 
For 2022, Van 't Hoff competed in the Formula Regional European Championship for the full season with MP Motorsport.

2023 
Van 't Hoff was retained by MP Motorsport for the 2023 season.

Racing record

Racing career summary 

† As Van 't Hoff was a guest driver, he was ineligible to score points.
* Season still in progress.

Complete F4 UAE Championship results 
(key) (Races in bold indicate pole position) (Races in italics indicate fastest lap)

Complete F4 Spanish Championship results 
(key) (Races in bold indicate pole position) (Races in italics indicate fastest lap)

Complete Formula Regional European Championship results 
(key) (Races in bold indicate pole position) (Races in italics indicate fastest lap)

† As Van 't Hoff was a guest driver, he was ineligible to score points.
* Season still in progress.

Complete Formula Regional Asian Championship results 
(key) (Races in bold indicate pole position) (Races in italics indicate the fastest lap of top ten finishers)

References

External links 
 

2004 births
Living people
Dutch racing drivers
Spanish F4 Championship drivers
Formula Regional Asian Championship drivers
Formula Regional European Championship drivers
MP Motorsport drivers
Pinnacle Motorsport drivers
Karting World Championship drivers
UAE F4 Championship drivers